European Patrol Corvette (EPC or PPX) is a Permanent Structured Cooperation (PESCO) project that was adopted by the European Council on 12 November 2019. The objective is to design and develop a new class of warship. The project is coordinated by Italy, with France, Spain and Greece participating and Portugal as an observer. In December 2021, it was reported that Norway and Denmark had also joined the project.

The ships will have a conventional hull of different dimensions, armament and propulsion systems. 

The EPC will have at least two versions:

 Combat variant (reported Italian preference): 3D radar and combat management systems, medium/short-range surface-to-air missiles (SAM), anti-torpedo countermeasures, envisaged top speed: ;

 Long-range patrol variant (reported French preference): 3D radar and combat management systems, medium/short-range SAM, envisaged top speed: 

Other sources had earlier suggested that three variants were to be considered: 

 EPC optimised for anti-surface (ASuW) and anti-aircraft (AAW) warfare with the possibility of anti-submarine warfare (ASW) and with self-defence capabilities
 EPC optimized for blue-water (offshore) patrol missions

Whatever the configuration and variants, as of 2022 the participating member states aim to potentially sign a contract as early as 2025 and the keel laying of the first ship to take place in 2026 and delivery starting in 2030.

In 2022, it was indicated that the project would receive a further 200 million Euro from the European Union's defence fund (EDF).

Participants 
Member states:

Companies:

  NAVIRIS (Joint-Venture of Fincantieri and Naval Group)
  Indra Sistemas, Navantia

Expected users 

 
Replaces: Cassiopea, Sirio ships

 
Supplements: Serviola, Infanta Elena Classes

 
 Supplements/Replaces: Floréal Class

See also

Common Security and Defence Policy
Permanent Structured Cooperation
European Main Battle Tank
Integrated Unmanned Ground System
European MALE RPAS
Eurocopter Tiger
European External Action Service
River-class offshore patrol vessel - comparable Royal Navy vessel

References

External links 
 Pesco
 Italian design
 French design
 Spanish design

Intelligence
Corvette classes
Stealth ships